Immigration to Hong Kong is the process by which people migrate to the Chinese special administrative region of Hong Kong for the purpose of residing there. The region has its own Hong Kong immigration policy governing how such migration may be carried, including for those immigrating from mainland China.

Originally a sparsely populated area of farming and fishing villages, During the First Opium War, Hong Kong was initially ceded to the British by the Qing Empire, in the Convention of Chuenpi. However, both countries were dissatisfied and did not ratify the agreement. After more than a year of further hostilities, Hong Kong Island was formally ceded to the United Kingdom in the 1842 Treaty of Nanking.

From 1898 to 1997, Hong Kong was under a 99-year lease to the United Kingdom, and within this period there was a refugee wave from the People's Republic of China to British Hong Kong, primarily between 1949 and 1979.

See also
 Waves of mass migrations from Hong Kong

References

Immigration law in Hong Kong